Mark Alan is an American actor, producer and Vice President of Renfield Productions  alongside famed director Joe Dante. He also co-produces the highly acclaimed online franchise Trailers From Hell.

Filmography

Film

TV

Producer

Awards and nominations

References

External links

Living people
Year of birth missing (living people)
21st-century American male actors
American male film actors
American film producers
Male actors from Lansing, Michigan